Brian Roberts may refer to:

Sportspeople
Brian Roberts (Australian rules footballer) (1945–2016), Australian rules footballer
Brian Roberts (English footballer) (born 1955), English football defender
Brian Roberts (New Zealand footballer) (born 1967), New Zealand international footballer
Brian Roberts (baseball) (born 1977), American baseball player
Brian Roberts (soccer) (born 1982), American soccer player
Brian Roberts (basketball) (born 1985), American basketball player

Others
Brian Birley Roberts (1912–1978), British polar expert, ornithologist and diplomat
Brian Roberts (historian) (born 1930), British historian on South African history
Brian L. Roberts (born 1959), American businessman, CEO of Comcast Corporation
Brian K. Roberts, American television director

See also 
Brian Robertson (disambiguation)